From April 20 to May 8, 2016, at least 33 people, including five children, died in District Layyah, Punjab Pakistan after eating a purposely poisoned laddu, a baked confection. Testing of the confectioneries revealed they were laced with the highly toxic insecticide chlorfenapyr. A sweet shop owner, Khalid Mahmood, confessed to mixing the pesticide into the sweets after an argument with his brother and co-owner.

Causes
A pesticide shop, close by the bakery where the sweets were bought, was being renovated, and the owner had left his products at the bakery for safekeeping. Mahmood may have used a small packet in the sweet mixture. 
	 
A man bought 5 kg of laddu for the celebration of a newborn on 17 April. At least 50 people consumed the sweets and ten of them died the same day. On 25 April, the death toll rose to 23 with 52 people still being treated at various hospitals. On 1 May the death toll rose to 33 with 13 people in hospital. The baby lost his father, six of his uncles and one aunt.

Aftermath
Two shop owners, and one worker, were initially arrested. Two weeks later the police announced that Mahmood had confessed.

The Prime Minister, Nawaz Sharif, stated that the incident would be thoroughly investigated, and ordered the police to find and take action against the responsible people.

The Chief Minister of Punjab, Shehbaz Sharif, visited Layyah on 2 May, and expressed his condolences and regrets for the loss of life.

See also
2012 Pakistan fake medicine crisis
1858 Bradford sweets poisoning

References

Deaths from food poisoning
2016 disasters in Pakistan
2016 health disasters
2016 crimes in Pakistan
Food safety scandals
Health disasters in Pakistan
Mass poisoning
Mass murder in 2016
2016 deaths